Ras Araya Selassie Yohannes ( araya səllase yohannəs; "horse name" Abba Deblaq) (1869/70 – 10 June 1888) was a son of atse Yohannes IV from his wife Masitire Selassie, a daughter of a Muslim Afar chieftain whom he married after she was Christened. Araya was nominated Crown Prince.

Araya was the first husband of Zewditu (later Empress), the daughter of atse Menelik II, having married her in January 1883. He was given the command of Wollo province at the time of his wedding. Because of a revolt raised in Wollo due to the death of dejazmach Amda Sadiq, chief of Tekaledere, in a quarrel with Araya's followers, Yohannes IV decided to appoint ras Mikael Ali, the traditional claimant to the lordship of Wollo. Ras Araya was transferred to Begemder and Dembaya in May 1886. In 1887–88, when the country was facing the Italian threat, he was commander of 40,000 troops near Adwa.

Araya died in his youth from smallpox, when the Emperor was returning from a campaign against the Italians at Seati (Battle of Dogali). His only son, by a weyzero Negesit, a lady from Wollo, was leul ras Gugsa Araya.

Biography

Early life 
Leul Araya Selassie Yohannes was born in Enderta, a part of Tigray in Ethiopia in 1869/70, the legitimate son of Emperor Yohannes IV of Ethiopia.  Mengesha Yohannes was his illegitimate half brother. He was granted the title of Ras in 1872 and was the governor of Enderta from 1872 to 1882.

Rise to Power 

On 24 October 1882, the fifteen-year-old Leul Araya Selassie Yohannes married six-year-old Leult Zewditu, eldest daughter of Negus Menelik of Shewa. The marriage was political, having been arranged when Menelik agreed to submit to Yohannes' rule. In 1882  Ras Araya was granted the title of Negus of Tigray and Wollo. In 1883, Araya Selassie Yohannes was made Shum of Wollo Province and, in 1886, he was made Shum of Begemder and Dembiya.

In 1885, Araya Selassie Yohannes fathered a son, Gugsa Araya Selassie.  The mother's identity is unknown.

Death 
On 10 June 1888, while in Mek'ele gathering an army for his father, Araya Selassie Yohannes died of smallpox. He was buried at Medhane Alem Church.

Honors 
 Grand Collar of the Order of the Seal of Solomon (1875)

Legacy
Familial rivalry between the two lines of descent from Emperor Yohannes IV proved to be a difficult issue for Emperor Menelik II and his successors.  Tigray Province was divided between Ras Gugsa Araya Selassie, the son of Ras Araya Selassie Yohannes, and Ras Seyum Mangasha, the son of Ras Mangasha Yohannes. Gugsa Araya Selassie ruled the eastern half of Tigray and Seyum Mangasha ruled the western half.

See also
 Monarchies of Ethiopia
 Ethiopian aristocratic and court titles
 Mangasha Yohannes - Half brother of Araya Selassie Yohannes

Notes 
Footnotes

Citations

References 
 

1870 births
1888 deaths
People from Tigray Region
Ethiopian military personnel
Ethiopian nobility
Ethiopian princes
Ethiopian Royal Family
19th-century Ethiopian people
Deaths from smallpox
Sons of emperors
Heirs apparent who never acceded